Lankasoma mahleri is a species of millipedes in the family Lankasomatidae. It is endemic to Sri Lanka.

References

Chordeumatida
Animals described in 1981
Millipedes of Asia
Endemic fauna of Sri Lanka
Arthropods of Sri Lanka